= Neathammer Gulch =

Valley in Oregon, US

Coordinates: 42°33′59″N 123°03′54″W

Neathammer Gulch is a valley in the U.S. state of Oregon.

Neathammer Gulch was named in 1874 after one Daniel E. Neathammer.
